Vesiculopustular eruption and leukemoid reaction in Down syndrome is a cutaneous condition, an extensive neonatal vesiculopustular eruption seen in people with Down syndrome.

See also 
 Adult T-cell leukemia/lymphoma
 List of cutaneous conditions

References 

Lymphoid-related cutaneous conditions